Ke Qingshi (Chinese: 柯庆施; October 10, 1902 – April 9, 1965) was a senior leader of the People's Republic of China and Chinese Communist Party in 1950s and 1960s.

Born in She County, Anhui Province, Ke joined Chinese Socialist Youth League in 1920, and the Chinese Communist Party in 1922.

After the establishment of the People's Republic of China, Ke served as the secretary of CCP Nanjing municipal committee, the mayor of Nanjing, a member of East China Military and Political Commission, Party chief of Jiangsu, first secretary of CCP Shanghai municipal committee, mayor of Shanghai, the first political commissioner of Nanjing Military Region, first secretary of CCP East China Bureau, and vice premier of the State Council. Ke was a member of 8th CCP politburo. He was deputy director of the United Front Work Department.

On April 9, 1965, Ke died in Chengdu.

References

1902 births
1965 deaths
People's Republic of China politicians from Anhui
People of the Cultural Revolution
Chinese Communist Party politicians from Anhui
Politicians from Huangshan
Political office-holders in Shanghai
Political office-holders in Jiangsu
Mayors of Nanjing
Members of the 8th Politburo of the Chinese Communist Party
People from She County, Anhui
Secretaries of the Communist Party Shanghai Committee